Çiğdemlik can refer to:

 Çiğdemlik, Amasya
 Çiğdemlik, Aydıntepe
 Çiğdemlik, Baskil